Clank may refer to:
 Clank (Ratchet & Clank), major character in the Ratchet & Clank video game series for PlayStations 2, 3, and 4
 Antonov An-30, airplane with the NATO reporting name "Clank"
 Curt Blefary (1943–2001), Baltimore Orioles baseball player nicknamed "Clank"
 Clank, an onomatopoeia meaning a metallic knocking sound
 A steampunk robot, in the webcomic Girl Genius
 Clank, Illinois, a community in the United States
 Clank! A Deck Building Adventure a 2016 Deck-building game by Renegade Game Studios